"J'ai un problème" is a French language song, a duet by . However, the single cover credited a shortened version of their name as Sylvie & Johnny.

The single
The song appears on an album of Vartan's that remains untitled, but is commonly known as the J'ai un problème album because of the appearance of the song as the first title track on the album.

"J'ai un problème" is written and composed by Jean Renard and Michel Mallory. The musical direction for the song was done by Gabriel Yared. the song was a huge hit in France staying at the top of the French Singles Chart for seven weeks during July and August 1973. making it one of the biggest successes of Sylvie Vartan, wife of Hallyday. The song was a success on many international charts as well and translated to a number of languages, most notably German and Italian.

Track list
Side A: "J'ai un problème"
Side B: "Te tuer d'amour"

Charts

Marie-Ève Janvier and Jean-François Breau version

In October 2011, the Canadian artists Marie-Ève Janvier & Jean-François Breau released the song as a duo from their joint album La vie à deux.

The music video for the new version was a tribute to the original singers, as it shows both Breau and Janvier on a motorcycle being affectionate with each other, exactly as in the original Johnny & Sylvie shooting.

Other versions

Language versions
In Autumn 1974,  recorded a German version in Paris as "Vielleicht bist du für mich noch nicht die große Liebe"; It was released as the B-side of their 45 rpm single that included "Te tuer d'amour" as side A.
In 1975,  released an Italian version "Il mio problema" as a double A side 45 rpm single alongside "Voglio tutto di te" that became a #1 hit on the Italian Singles Chart during May 1975.

Musical versions
Paul Mauriat and his orchestra played a musical score of the song and included it in his album Goodbye My Love, Goodbye as the second track in the album.

Live versions
Many artists have made rendition of the song on occasion. For example:
Alain Souchon and Jean-Jacques Goldman
Garou, a humorous version with assistance of many other acts in Juste pour rire in 2005
La Caravane des Enfoirés sang it in 2007 during the "Medley Johnny" sequence (referring to a number of famous Johnny Hallyday songs)

In popular culture
The song was used in the soundtrack of the 2014 French-Belgian film Not My Type

References

1973 singles
French-language songs
Johnny Hallyday songs
Sylvie Vartan songs
1973 songs
Songs written by Jean Renard (songwriter)
Songs written by Michel Mallory